37th National Board of Review Awards
January 9, 1966
The 37th National Board of Review Awards were announced on January 9, 1966.

Top Ten Films 
The Eleanor Roosevelt Story
The Agony and the Ecstasy
Doctor Zhivago
Ship of Fools
The Spy Who Came in from the Cold
Darling
The Greatest Story Ever Told
A Thousand Clowns
The Train
The Sound of Music

Top Foreign Films 
Juliet of the Spirits
The Overcoat
La Bohème
La Tia Tula
Gertrud

Winners 
Best Film: The Eleanor Roosevelt Story
Best Foreign Film: Juliet of the Spirits
Best Actor: Lee Marvin (Cat Ballou, Ship of Fools)
Best Actress: Julie Christie (Doctor Zhivago, Darling)
Best Supporting Actor: Harry Andrews (The Agony and the Ecstasy, The Hill)
Best Supporting Actress: Joan Blondell (The Cincinnati Kid)
Best Director: John Schlesinger (Darling)

External links 
National Board of Review of Motion Pictures :: Awards for 1965

1965
National Board of Review Awards
National Board of Review Awards
National Board of Review Awards
National Board of Review Awards